

The following lists events that happened during 1917 in Afghanistan.

Incumbents
 Monarch – Habibullah Khan

May 1917
It is reported that Turco-German agents are fomenting unrest in Afghanistan and are instigating the chiefs to make incursions into Russian Turkestan. These intrigues appear to have no success, however, and there are no indications that the loyalty of the emir to the Indian government has been in the least shaken.

 
Afghanistan
Years of the 20th century in Afghanistan
Afghanistan
1910s in Afghanistan